Cantuta may refer to:

Cantuta, a flower
National University of Education Enrique Guzmán y Valle, often called "La Cantuta"
La Cantuta massacre, the killings of a professor and nine students in Peru